Henry Simmons (born 1970) is an American actor

Henry Simmons may also refer to:

Harry Simmons (high jumper) (1911–1944), British Olympic high jumper
Henry Alexander Kendall Simmons (born 1979), American football player
Henry Simmons (cricketer) (1871-1934), Barbadian cricketer

See also

Harry Simmons (disambiguation)
Henry Simons (disambiguation)
Henry Symonds (disambiguation)